Phi Beta Delta was a college social fraternity in the United States founded at Columbia University on . In 1941 the fraternity merged with Pi Lambda Phi.

There were eight founders: 

Null would go on to become a NY State Appellate Judge, serving in that role from 1943-'49 The Founders stated, "Its purpose is to inculcate among its membership a fine spirit of loyalty, activity and scholarship toward their Alma Mater, to develop the highest ideals of conduct and to promote a close fraternal bond through means of carefully selected associates."

While entering the ranks of national fraternities somewhat later than its national peers, the organization quickly grew with chapters quickly formed at a number of eastern schools.  

In 1934, Phi Beta Delta absorbed the UPenn chapter of Omicron Alpha Tau, a smaller Jewish fraternity that was dispersing that year.  This group either merged with the existing Phi Beta Delta chapter on the campus, or re-established it. Four of 's other chapters went to Tau Delta Phi.

Phi Beta Delta effectively merged into Pi Lambda Phi on February 1, 1941. At the time, Pi Lambda Phi had 20 active chapters and Phi Beta Delta had 16. Considering duplications, the combined post-merger fraternity had a net of 33 chapters. All members and alumni of Phi Beta Delta were admitted into Pi Lambda Phi.

Symbols and traditions 
The badge was diamond-shaped, and edged with 20 pearls. Above the letters was a five-pointed star, and below were two crossed keys.

The colors of the Fraternity were blue and gold.

The flower was the Hyacinth.

Chapters
Chapters of Phi Beta Delta included the following, listed in the order of formation. Those noted in bold were active at the time of the merger, those in italics were dormant at the time of the merger:

Notes

See also
 List of Jewish fraternities and sororities
 Beta Sigma Rho
 Beta Sigma Tau
 Pi Lambda Phi

References

External links
Guide to the University of Chicago Phi Beta Delta Records 1925-1935 at the University of Chicago Special Collections Research Center

Fraternities and sororities in the United States
Pi Lambda Phi
Student organizations established in 1912
Defunct former members of the North American Interfraternity Conference
Historically Jewish fraternities in the United States
1912 establishments in New York City
Jewish organizations established in 1912